Moondragon (Heather Douglas) is a fictional character appearing in American comic books published by Marvel Comics. A powerful telepath, master martial artist, minor telekinetic and highly skilled geneticist, Moondragon's most notable characteristics are her shaved head and achieving excellence in virtually every area of human accomplishment.

Unlike most Marvel characters, who have gained their paranormal abilities through birth or accident, Moondragon has achieved her extraordinary talents strictly through extreme degrees of personal regimen.

Publication history

Madame MacEvil first appeared in Iron Man #54 (January 1973). The issue was scripted by Bill Everett (creator of the Sub-Mariner) and Mike Friedrich and drawn by Everett and George Tuska.

Fictional character biography

Origin

Heather Douglas was born in Los Angeles, California, daughter of Arthur and Yvette Steckley Douglas. When Heather was still a girl, her father was driving her and her mother through the desert when they accidentally happened to see the spaceship of Thanos land; the space villain did not want any witnesses, so he destroyed their car. Heather was thrown clear and survived, but her parents were killed. (She would later discover that her father's soul was bound into a new body, becoming Drax the Destroyer.) She was found by Thanos' father, Mentor, who took her to his home world, Titan, to be raised by the monks of Shao-Lom.

From the monks, Heather develops her body to its full potential, becoming a formidable martial artist. They teach Heather various scientific disciplines such as chemistry and genetic engineering; but most significantly, they help Heather tap into her latent psionic powers, present within all humans. Heather is able to develop her mental powers far beyond even those of her teachers, so much so that she eventually mentally contacts a powerful entity called the Dragon of the Moon. The Dragon immediately tries to corrupt and take her over, but she fights back, driving the Dragon away. This fills her with pride and an overwhelming sense of superiority. To commemorate her victory, she takes the name Moondragon. Unknown to Heather, the Dragon subtly continues to influence her on a subconscious level.

Heather's choice of the name Moondragon causes an uproar amongst the monks of Shao-Lom, so much so that Mentor has to confront her on the matter. After the confrontation, Moondragon is approached by Runner, one of the Elders of the Universe. Runner takes Moondragon on a tour of the universe, showing her its fantastic sights and wonders. Runner eventually takes Moondragon to the surface of a sun. He informs her that the sun would go nova in several years. Moondragon points out to Runner that the sun harbored an inhabited planet and that they should warn the inhabitants. Runner regretfully responds that, when he chose the path of freedom, he lost the option to interfere with others' destinies. Moondragon argues, "What good is freedom?" when it only leads to death. When Runner fails to answer her satisfactorily, she requests to be brought back home.

Sometime later, Thanos attacks Titan, destroying the monastery and the Shao-Lom monks. Moondragon escapes in her spaceship and flees to Earth.

Alliances against Thanos and Korvac

She first returns to Earth under the guise of "Madame MacEvil" to develop a means to combat Thanos. This leads to the creation of villains like Angar the Screamer, Ramrod, and the Dark Messiah. In her first appearance, she forces Iron Man to battle Namor in order to study them. She then reveals her true identity and helps the Avengers in their first confrontation with Thanos. 
She battles Daredevil but is nearly killed by her ex-ally Kerwin J. Broderick. She restores Daredevil's sight briefly with her alien pressure point skills and then first meets Captain Mar-Vell. She aids them against Angar, the Dark Messiah, and Terrex. She falls in love with Daredevil but then returns to outer space. She aids Captain Mar-Vell, Drax, and the Avengers against Thanos.

Moondragon is one of the three candidates to be the "Celestial Madonna", who was prophesied to give birth to a universal savior, but she loses to Mantis. She then becomes an adventurer and joins the Avengers. Although her time with the team is short ending in Avengers #151 when she meets the heroine Hellcat and takes her to Titan to train her. The following year Moondragon returns to help the Avengers in their final (until the 1990s) battle with Thanos.

Moondragon is present when the Avengers confront Korvac; her powers allow her to see into his mind while they fight, and she decides that his goal of saving the universe by ruling it is noble. She stays out of the battle until Korvac, dejected, commits suicide.

Paths of corruption and redemption
Moondragon leaves Earth with Drax and finds a planet immersed in war, so she decides to take mental control of all its inhabitants to force them to live in peace, setting herself up as their "peace goddess". Drax summons the Avengers to intervene and in the resultant confrontation, Moondragon is forced to kill her father with her mental powers. Afterwards, Thor takes her before a real god—his father, Odin, to be judged. Odin perceives within Moondragon a stalwart but tainted spirit. He condemns her to wear a magical headband that reduces her mental powers until she has overcome her arrogance and learned humility. He also assigns Valkyrie to be her guardian.

When Valkyrie rejoins the Defenders, Moondragon is forced to come along. At first, she sends out low level telepathic signals, luring threats to the vicinity of the Defenders' headquarters, hoping that one of these threats would remove her headband or force the Defenders to remove the headband so she may use her powers to aid them unhindered.

Despite the fact that Moondragon resents being with the Defenders, she wants to be accepted by them as a good person. In an encounter with Asgardian trolls, Moondragon resists the temptation of letting the trolls and the Dragon of the Moon remove her headband, thus proving herself to Odin, who promptly lets the headband fall off.

This personal victory is short-lived, for soon afterwards the Defenders have to fight the spawns of the mutated spores they fought months before. The spawns soon coalesce into a single gargantuan monster, which Moondragon vanquishes with the help of the Gargoyle. Unknown to Moondragon, in doing so, she is infected with the mutated spores. She does not find out about the infection until weeks later, when the spores have supplanted a good portion of her own internal organs. The Dragon of the Moon appears again and tells her it can save her life, but only if she agrees to be its host. Moondragon initially turns down its offer, knowing that it will use her to kill the Defenders. The Dragon then mocks Moondragon's sentimentality by showing her what the other Defenders are saying about her behind her back even though she has reformed. Finally overwhelmed with pain, she accepts. Now totally corrupted, Moondragon battles the Defenders until Andromeda, Interloper, Manslaughter, and Valkyrie sacrifice themselves to kill both her and the Dragon.

Heather's soul manages to survive, and, now free from the Dragon again, contacts her cousin Pamela; through her, she is able to obtain a new body for herself, a clone created on Titan. For a while, she and her cousin, who becomes the heroine Sundragon, adventure together in space.

Cosmic cohort

After Quasar is appointed Protector of the Universe, Moondragon insinuates herself into his life. Using the pseudonym H.D. Steckley she becomes an engineer and saleswoman for Vaughn Security Systems. She is convinced that in time Quasar will realize they are eminently qualified to form the universe's most cosmic coupling. Quasar, however, asserts that qualifications have nothing to do with feelings and rebuffs her. She persists for a time, but eventually gets the message and loses interest.

When Adam Warlock seeks people to help him safeguard the Infinity Gems, he chooses Moondragon to keep the Mind Gem—but only after erecting safeguards so Moondragon cannot exploit the gem's full power. Still, she agrees to join his team, the Infinity Watch. She eventually loses the gem when it is stolen by Rune.

Moondragon later becomes an associate of Genis-Vell (the third Captain Marvel), determined to help him control his cosmic awareness. During this time, she falls in love with Marlo Chandler, the wife of Rick Jones (whom Captain Marvel was bonded to). The two elope on a lesbian relationship to the reluctant understanding of Rick, with whom Marlo is having marital problems anyway. Sometime later, Marlo gets over her feelings for Moondragon and decides to return to Rick. Moondragon tells her she must have accidentally prodded her telepathically into the relationship, but this is a lie to make the break-up easier. In truth, Moondragon is heartbroken; she leaves shortly after with Phyla-Vell.

Annihilation

In the Annihilation miniseries, Moondragon and Phyla-Vell return, visiting the graves of Mar-Vell and Genis-Vell. At this time, Thanos appears and kidnaps Moondragon, using her as a hostage to draw out Drax the Destroyer for an unknown purpose. Also, when she is infected with the Annihilation Wave parasites, she is forced to reveal Annihilus' plan to destroy all life in the universe, which he would then rule. Thanos causes her to regurgitate the parasites, having no interest in Annihilus' plan. However, Thanos' plan for revenge is cut short as Drax rushes off to save his daughter, which he does by ripping Thanos' heart out, just before the villain was about to save the universe from Annihilus. However, Drax and Moondragon then manage to free the Silver Surfer, who in turn helps free Galactus, destroying Annihlus' plans. Galactus then teleports away Drax and Moondragon. Moondragon "loses track" of Drax and is reunited with Phyla-Vell.

Annihilation: Conquest

In Quasar: Annihilation: Conquest, the love of Phyla and Moondragon is explored in depth. Due to the Phalanx taking over the Kree Empire, Phyla and Heather have to find the 'savior' that is shown to Phyla (Quasar) in a vision. They come across the Super-Adaptoid, who was absorbed by the Phalanx and set to prevent the women from finding the savior. During the battle, Moondragon has to change into a dragon, like the 'Dragon of the Moon' she had to fight most of her life. Moondragon cannot change back into her human form. Moondragon and Phyla follow a voice Phyla hears to find the savior for the Kree race, who is being attacked by the Phalanx. In the end, it turns out the voice belongs to the Supreme Intelligence of the Kree. It helps them find a cocoon, which is restoring Adam Warlock. The cocoon breaks open and Phyla and Moondragon ask Warlock to help them fight against the Phalanx. Shortly after, the Phalanx arrives, led by the murderous android Ultron. Moondragon attempts to protect Phyla, and Ultron responds by plunging his arm into her chest. Heather dies shortly after in Phyla's arms.

Sometime later, Phyla and Drax are alerted by a prophet that Moondragon may be attempting to return. Mentor concludes that this may be the case, and so kills the two of them so that they may journey into the realm of the dead to retrieve her. Phyla saves Moondragon from the gullet of the Dragon of the Moon, and they return to life.

Guardians of the Galaxy

After her resurrection, Moondragon joins Phyla back at Knowhere and is accepted as an unofficial member of the Guardians of the Galaxy. She assists Cosmo and Mantis as part of the telepathic support team. Her resurrection leaves her mind more open than it had been before her death, so she is able to detect things before either Mantis or Cosmo do. Her increased sensitivity also leaves her more vulnerable to psychic manipulation by Starhawk, who has herself been released from confinement.

With Phyla's death at the hands of Adam Magus, Moondragon takes it upon herself to become a field agent for the Guardians of the Galaxy. However, she becomes host to an alien parasite originating in a parallel universe across the Fault, a time-space tear created by Black Bolt's Terrigen Bomb. Worse, she is biometrically cuffed by Cynosure, leader of the Luminals (an organization of heroic alien superhumans from the planet Xarth III), who intends to have the creature tried for killing one of her fellow Luminals. To make things worse, members of the Church of Universal Truth kidnap Moondragon and Cynosure, seeing the parasite as a god, whom they intend to birth. Luckily, the Guardians and Luminals mount a joint rescue attempt and extract the two. With the help of Knowhere's medical staff, they are able to remove the organism from Moondragon. During these experiences, Moondragon has visions of a cocoon and Phyla being alive.

Powers and abilities
Heather Douglas is a human who has accessed her full psionic potential through extreme training under the Titanian monks of Shao-Lom. She is also highly educated in Titanian science and is a master martial artist.

Moondragon primarily possesses tremendous telepathic abilities which have enabled her to control the population of an entire planet to stop an ongoing war, while enslaving the thunder god Thor as her personal lover. She has demonstrated willpower and spiritual strength rivaling that of Thanos, and the Sorcerer Supreme Doctor Strange, pierced the psionic shields of the cosmic entity Galactus to enable communication, and when borrowing her abilities, Thanos almost manages to overwhelm the Devourer.

Beyond communication and control of other minds, she can induce mental illusions, cause personality changes, and erase specific memories. She can also fire bolts of psionic energy as concussive blasts that can either stun an opponent or render an opponent brain dead.

She is also a low-level telekinetic, an ability that lets her move and manipulate most physical matter by using only her thoughts, levitate herself and others, create shields of psychic force, and fire concussive psychokinetic energy blasts with sufficient strength to affect steel.

Moondragon has undergone extreme levels of training in the Titanian martial arts, as well as mental disciplines allowing her near-complete control over her body, including autonomic functions such as heartbeat, bleeding, and breathing, as well as awareness of pain. She has honed her strength, speed, stamina, agility and reflexes to her highest limits. Her martial arts skills have even allowed her to beat Captain America and Mantis in hand-to-hand combat.

Heather possesses a genius intellect and is extremely knowledgeable in various areas of advanced Titanian scientific disciplines, such as genetics and bionics, and has been able to upgrade the cyborgs Ramrod and Angar the Screamer. She restored Daredevil's eyesight.

Moondragon has demonstrated the ability to assume the form of her namesake, a fire-breathing dragon capable of surviving in outer space, traversing interstellar distances.

Additionally, she is also a highly skilled starship pilot.

Reception

Accolades 

 In 2015, Entertainment Weekly ranked Moondragon 61st in their "Let's rank every Avenger ever" list.
 In 2017, Autostraddle ranked Moondragon 6th in their "7 LGBT Women Who Need to Appear in the MCU Immediately" list.
 In 2021, Screen Rant included Moondragon in their "10 LGBTQ+ Marvel Heroes That Should Join The MCU" list.
 In 2021, The Mary Sue included Moondragon in their "6 of Marvel’s Most Powerful Women Who Have Yet to Hit the Big Screen" list.
 In 2022, Screen Rant included Moondragon in their "15 Most Powerful Guardians Of The Galaxy Members In The Comics" list and in their "10 Female Marvel Heroes That Should Come To The MCU" list.
 In 2022, CBR.com ranked Moondragon 8th in their "10 Best Cosmic Heroes in Marvel Comics" list.

Other versions

Age of Apocalypse
In the Age of Apocalypse timeline, Moondragon has never accessed her full psionic potential and instead was approached by and joined Quentin Quire's group of low level telepaths to create a kind of "psychic pyramid scheme" known as the Overmind which Quentin uses to increase his own limited skills.

Heather along with the telepaths that compose the Overmind are later confronted and killed by the Shadow King.

Ultimate Marvel
In the first issue of the Ultimate Extinction arc, as part of the Ultimate Marvel line, a bald woman with a dragon tattoo and considerable martial arts prowess attacks Misty Knight. A computer database later identifies the woman as Heather Douglas aka "Heather Moon", who has been dead for decades.

This woman is revealed to be a clone of the original Heather Douglas. There are in fact hundreds of these clones (as well as a male equivalent, bald clones of an unnamed man). These clones were created by a cult that worships Gah Lak Tus (the Ultimate version of Galactus). They try to destroy S.H.I.E.L.D. and face the Ultimates and the X-Men while other heroes attempt to deal with the threat of Gah Lak Tus.

Marvel Zombies
In the original Marvel Zombies series, Moondragon is briefly seen as one of the many infected heroes.

Marvel Adventures: Fantastic Four
Moondragon runs a "Hall of Magic Mirrors" in a carnival. She aids the Fantastic Four in battling Baron Mordo in this wordless tale.

In other media

Television
 Moondragon appears in the X-Men episode "Beyond Good and Evil (Part 3)" in a non-speaking role.

Video games
 Moondragon appears as an NPC in Marvel Heroes, voiced by Mary Elizabeth McGlynn.
 Moondragon appears as a playable character in Lego Marvel's Avengers.
 Moondragon appears in the computer video game Marvel: Avengers Alliance.
 Moondragon appears as a playable character in Marvel Strike Force.

Parody 
 Moondragon also appears in the MAD episode "Captain America's Got Talent", voiced by Rachel Ramras. She read from a computer stating she was an Avenger for 22 seconds.

References

External links
 
 Annihilation: Conquest preview on AfterEllen.com

Avengers (comics) characters
Characters created by Bill Everett
Characters created by George Tuska
Characters created by Mike Friedrich
Comics characters introduced in 1973
Fictional avatars
Fictional bisexual females
Fictional characters from Los Angeles
Fictional characters with superhuman durability or invulnerability
Fictional engineers
Fictional geneticists
Guardians of the Galaxy characters
Marvel Comics characters who have mental powers
Marvel Comics LGBT superheroes
Marvel Comics martial artists
Marvel Comics scientists
Marvel Comics telekinetics
Marvel Comics telepaths
Marvel Comics female superheroes